John Paul Kelly may refer to:

 John Paul Kelly (football) (born 1987), Irish footballer
 John-Paul Kelly (ice hockey) (born 1959), Canadian ice hockey player
 J. P. Kelly, English professional poker player